Kate Bell (born 21 April 1981) is a British actress, best known for her role as Kelly Bradshaw in the long-running BBC school drama Grange Hill. She appeared in the show from 1995 to 2001.

She has also appeared in The Bill and the children's series Samson Superslug.

External links

References

1981 births
Living people
Place of birth missing (living people)
British television actresses